Ďurková is a village and municipality in Stará Ľubovňa District in the Prešov Region of northern Slovakia.

History
In historical records the village was first mentioned in 1427.

Geography
The municipality lies at an elevation of 550 metres (1,804 ft) and covers an area of 3.979 km² (1.536 mi²). It has a population of about 276.

Genealogical resources

The records for genealogical research are available at the state archive "Statny Archiv in Presov, Slovakia"

 Roman Catholic church records (births/marriages/deaths): 1743-1895 (parish B)
 Greek Catholic church records (births/marriages/deaths): 1826-1913 (parish B)

See also
 List of municipalities and towns in Slovakia

External links
http://www.statistics.sk/mosmis/eng/run.html
Surnames of living people in Durkova

Villages and municipalities in Stará Ľubovňa District